Liotella crassicostata is a species of sea snail, a marine gastropod mollusk in the family Skeneidae,.

Description
The height of the shell attains 0.8 mm, its diameter 0.8 mm. The yellowish white shell has a helicoidal shape. Its umbilicus is narrow. The shell contains 2½ whorls, slightly flattened at the periphery and then rounded. The sculpture consists, besides the lines of growth, of strong ribs (their number is shown about correctly in the image). The aperture is almost round. The columella is thickened.

References

External links
 To Encyclopedia of Life
 To World Register of Marine Species

crassicostata
Gastropods described  in 1908